The Pastoral Suite, Op. 19, is a three-movement suite for orchestra written in 1938 by Swedish composer Lars-Erik Larsson. The suite remains not only one of Larsson's most celebrated compositions, but also one of the most frequently performed pieces of Swedish art music. In particular, the Romance (No. 2) is often performed and recorded as a stand-alone concert piece.

Background
Beginning in 1937, the Swedish Broadcasting Corporation—the country's national, publicly-funded radio—employed Larsson as a composer-in-residence, music producer, and conductor; his main task was to write music to accompany various radio programs. One of Larsson's colleagues was the Swedish poet Hjalmar Gullberg, who had joined Swedish Radio the year before and headed its drama division. Together, the two men developed a genre of popular entertainment they called the "lyrical suite", which alternated recited poetry with musical interludes. Larsson's first commission of this type was to compose four orchestral vignettes to accompany the 1938 radio recitation of a Swedish-language translation Shakespeare's The Winter's Tale; he subsequently published these as A Winter's Tale (Op. 18). 

After the success of A Winter's Tale, Larsson began composing a second lyrical suite for Swedish Radio: The Hours of the Day. He contributed six orchestral movements to accompany six poems by various Swedish authors:

 No. 1: Adagio
 Recitation: A Day by Verner von Heidenstam
 No. 1: Allegro
 Recitation: The Earth Sings by Erik Blomberg
 No. 2: Andantino con moto
 Recitation: Siesta by Oscar Levertin
 No. 3: Adagio
 Recitation: The Two Tones by Kerstin Hed
 No. 4: Vivice
 Recitation: An Afternoon by  
 No. 5: Andantino
 Recitation: Man's Home by Erik Blomberg
 No. 6: Andante tranquillo

The Hours of the Day—and, by extension, what would later become the Pastoral Suite—premiered over Swedish Radio on 11 October 1938, with Larsson conducting the Radio Entertainment Orchestra in Stockholm; the Swedish actor Gunnar Sjöberg read the first, second, third, and fifth poems, while the Swedish actress Gunn Wållgren read the third and fourth poems. Afterwards, Larsson excerpted Nos. 1, 3, and 4 as the Pastoral Suite, while Nos. 2, 5, and 6 faded into obscurity.

Structure
The Pastoral Suite, which lasts about 12 to 13 minutes, is in three movements. They are as follows:

As a whole, the piece is in the neoclassical style that was "fashionable" in Swedish between the two world wars. In the Scherzo, Larsson's writing recalls the concerto grosso form.

Instrumentation
The Pastoral Suite is scored the following instruments:

Woodwinds: 2 flutes, 2 oboes, 2 clarinets (in B), and 2 bassoons
Brass: 2 horns (in F) and 2 trumpets (in C)
Percussion: timpani
Strings: violins, violas, cellos, and double basses

The two outer movements are for full orchestras, whereas the central Romance is for strings.  published the suite in 1942.

Recordings
The sortable table below lists commercially available recordings of the Pastoral Suite:

Notes, references, and sources

 

 

 

 

 

 

 

Compositions by Lars-Erik Larsson
20th-century classical music
Classical music in Sweden
1938 compositions
Orchestral suites